Halstead is a name, usually a surname. The surname derives from the places in Essex, Kent and Leicestershire.

People with the surname include:

 Anthony Halstead (born 1945), English conductor and horn player
 Beverly Halstead (1933–1991), British paleontologist
 Bianca Halstead (1965–2001), American rock musician
 Bob Halstead (born 1944), Australian underwater diver
 Daniel J. Halstead, American publisher
 Dirck Halstead (born 1936), American photojournalist
 Eric Halstead (1912–1991), New Zealand politician and diplomat
 Fred Halstead (1927–1988), American activist and presidential candidate
 Gil Halstead (1893–1970), American college football player
 Henry Halstead (1897–1985), American bandleader
 Ivor Halstead (1888–1959), English journalist and author
 Jerry Don Halstead (born 1963), American professional heavyweight boxer
 John Halstead (1886–1951), American Olympic athlete.
 John G. H. Halstead (1922–1998), Canadian diplomat. 
 Mark Halstead (born 1990), English footballer
 Martin Halstead (born 1986), English company director and pilot
 Murat Halstead (1829–1908), American newspaper editor and magazine writer
 Neil Halstead, English songwriter and musician
 Nellie Halstead (1910–1991), English athlete
 Rebecca S. Halstead (born 1959), former commander of the U.S. Army Ordnance Center
 Rosalind Halstead (born 1983), British actress
 Scott Halstead (born 1930), American physician-scientist, virologist and epidemiologist
 Ted Halstead (1968–2020), American think tank executive
 Trevor Halstead (born 1976), South African former rugby union footballer
 William Halstead (1794–1878), American politician
 William Halstead (1837-1916), American sailor
 William S. Halstead (1903-1987), American inventor

People with Halstead as a given name include:
 Halstead Dorey (1874–1946), U.S. Army major general
 Halstead C. Fowler (1889–1950), U.S. Army colonel
Fictional characters:

 Jay Halstead, on the television series Chicago P.D.
 Will Halstead, on the television series Chicago Med

See also 
 Halsted (disambiguation)

References